Loot may refer to:

Film
Loot (1919 film), a film by William C. Dowlan
Loot (1970 film), a British film by Silvio Narizzano
Loot (2008 film), a documentary
Loot (2011 film), an Indian film
Loot (2012 film), a Nepali film
Loot 2 (2017 film), a Nepali film

Other uses
Loot (play), a 1965 play by Joe Orton
Loot (EP), a 1991 extended play by The Clouds
Loot (magazine), a British classified ads magazine
Loot (video gaming), in-game items in video games
Loot Interactive, a video game developer
Heiki Loot (born 1971), Estonian judge and civil servant 
Lesbian Organization of Toronto
Loot, a novel by Aaron Elkins
Loot (TV series)

See also 
Looting
Lute, a musical instrument